Leonid Alfonsovich Ostrovski (17 January 1936 in Riga – 17 April 2001 in Kyiv) was a Soviet football player and manager of Jewish origin.

Honours
 Soviet Top League winner: 1960, 1966, 1967, 1968
 Soviet Cup winner: 1960, 1964, 1966

International career
Ostrovski made his debut for the national team on 18 November 1961 in a friendly against Argentina (he was selected for the 1958 FIFA World Cup squad, but did not play in any games at the tournament).

He played in two World Cups: 1962 and 1966. He was the only footballer from Latvia for the Soviet Union in the World Cups.

References

External links
 Profile (in Russian)
 KLISF profile
 Profile (in Russia)
 

1936 births
2001 deaths
Footballers from Riga
Latvian footballers
Soviet footballers
Soviet Union international footballers
1958 FIFA World Cup players
1962 FIFA World Cup players
1966 FIFA World Cup players
Soviet Top League players
FC Torpedo Moscow players
FC Dynamo Kyiv players
Latvian football managers
Soviet football managers
FC Dnipro Cherkasy managers
Jewish footballers
Latvian Jews
Soviet Jews
Association football defenders
FC Mashuk-KMV Pyatigorsk players